J. Mason Farm is a historic farm located near Ashland, New Castle County, Delaware. The property includes two contributing buildings.  They are a stone house (1827) and a stone and frame bank barn (c. 1827).  The house is a two-story, gable-roofed, fieldstone structure with a two-story, three bay, frame wing that may have been added in the 1930s or 1940s.  The barn walls are of uncoursed fieldstone finished with a pebbled stucco.

In the 20th Century, it became part of Ashland Farm, a Du Pont estate. It was added to the National Register of Historic Places in 1986.

References

Farms on the National Register of Historic Places in Delaware
Houses completed in 1827
Houses in New Castle County, Delaware
National Register of Historic Places in New Castle County, Delaware
1827 establishments in Delaware